Raggedy Ann and Andy in The Pumpkin Who Couldn't Smile (a.k.a. simply The Pumpkin Who Couldn't Smile) is a 1979 animated television special featuring Raggedy Ann and Raggedy Andy. Produced by Chuck Jones Enterprises, it was first televised October 31, 1979 on CBS. The special was a sequel to the 1978 Christmas special, Raggedy Ann and Andy in The Great Santa Claus Caper.

Synopsis
Raggedy Ann (June Foray), Andy (Daws Butler) and their dog, Raggedy Arthur, noticed how cruel their neighbor Aunt Agatha (Foray) is and how sad her nephew Ralph (Steven Rosenberg) is on Halloween but realized that Aunt Agatha had a Scrooge-like attitude towards the holiday. At first, the Raggedeys seem upset with how Aunt Agatha treats her nephew and think that she's really mean to treat him in such a way by not allowing Ralph to go trick or treating with the rest of the children in the neighborhood. However, they come up with an idea on how to make Ralph happy. Raggedy Ann reasons that if there's an unhappy little boy where they live, then there must be an unhappy pumpkin somewhere out there waiting for a little boy. The Raggedeys set out to find the pumpkin who's just right for Ralph. The abandoned pumpkin in the pumpkin patch (Les Tremayne) is very gloomy and emits pumpkin seeds as tears every time he weeps. The only way to cheer up the sad pumpkin is to bring it to Ralph as a gift and then convince Aunt Agatha to change her Scrooge-like ways on Halloween by recalling to her in her sleep that Agatha (or Aggie, as she was known as a child) and a witch costume that Agatha wore and loved as a child. Agatha wakes up realized that she was wrong on not allowing Ralph to go trick or treating and, discovering Ralph and the now smiling pumpkin in his room, greats the pumpkin. The movie ends with Aunt Agatha putting on a witches' hat and carrying a broom while Ralph wears a pirate's costume with the now smiling pumping in tow surprising the neighbors as both Aunt Agatha and Ralph merrily go trick or treating together and Aunt Agatha finding a newfound joy for the Halloween season.

Voice cast
 June Foray as Raggedy Ann/Aunt Agatha (credited as Mrs. Hobart Donavan)/Neighbor
 Daws Butler as Raggedy Andy
 Steven Rosenberg as Ralph
 Les Tremayne as The Pumpkin

Reception
The special brought in a 14.4/24 rating/share, ranking third in its timeslot, behind NBC's Real People (20.0/33) and ABC's Eight Is Enough (18.0/30).

References

External links
 
 

1979 in American television
1979 television specials
1970s American television specials
CBS television specials
Halloween television specials
Films about sentient toys
Films scored by Earl Robinson
Television shows directed by Chuck Jones
Raggedy Ann